The Sea Wolf is a 1941 American adventure drama film adaptation of Jack London's 1904 novel The Sea-Wolf with Edward G. Robinson, Ida Lupino, John Garfield, and Alexander Knox. The film was written by Robert Rossen and directed by Michael Curtiz.

The film was first premiered onboard the S.S. America. Later it was screened at the 9th annual Turner Classic Movies Film Festival on April 26, 2018 in Los Angeles. The version of the film screened was the original theatrical cut that was reassembled after 35mm nitrate elements were discovered at the Museum of Modern Art. It included thirteen minutes of footage that were cut from the film in 1947 when it was re-released as a double-feature with the film The Sea Hawk. The original cut of the film, digitally remastered and restored, was released through Warner Brothers' Archive Collection on DVD and Blu-ray on October 10, 2017.

Plot
Refined and literate fiction writer Humphrey Van Weyden and escaped convict Ruth Webster are passengers on a ferry that collides with another vessel and sinks. They are rescued from drowning by the Ghost, a seal-hunting ship. At the helm is the Captain, Wolf Larsen, a brutal sadist who delights in dominating and abusing his crew.

Larsen is very well read and impressively self-educated, but crude and brutish in his personal inclinations. He refuses to return to port early and forces Van Weyden to work in the kitchen under the supervision of the treacherous and greedy ship's cook. He also compels Van Weyden to spend time alone with him in his cabin, where the two discuss philosophy and the nature of humanity. Larsen asserts the Nietzschean proposition that man is essentially an amoral animal, and that morality is a construct that has no bearing on life onboard his ship. He predicts that Van Weyden's character will change as he accustoms himself to the uncivilized life among the crew, where no one has any value higher than his own personal gain.

When Prescott, the ship's drunken doctor, determines that the unconscious Webster needs a transfusion to survive, Larsen "volunteers" Leach, even though there is no way to test if his blood is compatible. It is, and she recovers. As time goes by, she comes to depend on Leach for protection and, despite himself, Leach falls in love with her. Larsen humiliates Prescott, who retaliates by revealing to the crew that Larsen's own brother, Death Larsen, another sea captain, is hunting him, having vowed to kill him; Prescott then commits suicide.

Fear of being hunted drives some members of the crew to mutiny, led by the already rebellious George Leach. They ambush Larsen and throw him and his first mate overboard. However, Larsen manages to grab a trailing rope, climb back aboard, and put down the mutiny. He announces to the crew that an informant has revealed to him who the conspirators were but, instead of punishing them, he betrays the informant, the ship's cook, to them. They punish the cook by dropping him into the water, dragging him behind the ship as he holds onto a rope for dear life. This is at first intended as a practical joke; however, a shark bites off the cook's leg.

Eventually, Leach, Webster, Van Weyden, and another crewman escape on a dory. However, they discover that the wily Larsen had replaced their water supply with vinegar. The fourth man later sacrifices himself by going overboard to help conserve the little water they have.

Larsen is subject to intense headaches that leave him temporarily blind, but has managed to hide his condition from the crew. He knows that he will eventually lose his sight permanently. When Larsen's brother catches up with him, the Ghost is attacked and it starts to sink. The ship escapes into a fog bank, but Larsen goes blind again and his debility is revealed to all. The crew seizes the opportunity to take to the boats.

Van Weyden, Leach, and Webster sight the Ghost and, having no other choice, reboard her. The ship appears to be deserted, so Leach goes below for provisions. He is ambushed by Larsen, who locks him in a compartment. Larsen is determined to go down with the Ghost and take as many others with him as he can. Van Weyden tries to get the key from Larsen and is fatally shot, but manages to hide the fact from the now nearly blind captain. He tricks Larsen into giving Webster the key by promising to stay with Larsen to the bitter end. This act of seeming self-sacrifice disturbs Larsen, causing him to question his whole philosophy, until he realizes that Van Weyden is dying. Vindicated in his own mind, Wolf Larsen awaits his demise. Leach and Webster reboard the dory together and sail toward land.

Cast
 Edward G. Robinson as Wolf Larsen
 Ida Lupino as Ruth Webster
 John Garfield as George Leach
 Alexander Knox as Humphrey Van Weyden
 Gene Lockhart as Louis J. Prescott
 Barry Fitzgerald as Cookie
 Stanley Ridges as Johnson
 David Bruce as Young Sailor
 Francis McDonald as Svenson
 Howard Da Silva as Harrison
 Frank Lackteen as Smoke
 Ethan Laidlaw as Crewman (uncredited)

Production
Robert Rossen's re-draft of the script may be the greatest influence on the film. While the tyrannical captain remained both victim and oppressed in a capitalist hierarchy, he became a symbol of fascism. Rossen also split the novel's idealistic hero into an intellectual dishwasher and a rebellious seaman and gave the seaman a love interest, played by Lupino. Rossen added scenes for this pair, partly urged by Lupino. However, Warner Bros. cut many political items during production.

George Raft turned down a role because it was too small. Filmink magazine later said "as if that mattered with Michael Curtiz directing, and Edward G Robinson starring from a Jack London novel."

The Sea Wolf has several connections to the city of London, Ontario, aside from the source author's surname. Studio executive Jack L. Warner and cast member Gene Lockhart were both born in the city and cast member Knox attended university there. For these reasons, the film's Canadian premiere was held at London's Capitol Theatre.

Box office
According to Warner Bros records, the film earned $1,237,000 domestically and $644,000 foreign.

Awards
The film was nominated for the Oscar for Best Special Effects (Byron Haskin, Nathan Levinson) at the 14th Academy Awards.

Radio adaptation
The Sea Wolf was presented on Screen Directors Playhouse on February 3, 1950, with Robinson re-creating his role from the film.

See also
 List of American films of 1941

References

External links
 
 
 
 

1941 films
1940s adventure drama films
American adventure drama films
1940s English-language films
American black-and-white films
Films based on The Sea-Wolf
Films directed by Michael Curtiz
Films scored by Erich Wolfgang Korngold
Films with screenplays by Robert Rossen
Sea adventure films
Seafaring films
Warner Bros. films
Films set in the 1900s
Films set in San Francisco
1940s historical adventure films
American historical adventure films
1941 drama films
1940s American films